Gustavo Ocampo (born 26 June 1947) is a Peruvian former swimmer. He competed in the men's 200 metre butterfly at the 1964 Summer Olympics.

References

External links
 

1947 births
Living people
Peruvian male butterfly swimmers
Olympic swimmers of Peru
Swimmers at the 1964 Summer Olympics
Pan American Games competitors for Peru
Swimmers at the 1963 Pan American Games
Place of birth missing (living people)
20th-century Peruvian people